Junri Namigata and Erika Sema were the defending champions, having won the event in 2013, however both players chose to defend their titles with different partners. Namigata partnered with Akiko Yonemura but lost in the quarterfinals whilst Sema partnered with Miki Miyamura but lost in the first round.

Shuko Aoyama and Eri Hozumi won the title, defeating Naomi Broady and Eleni Daniilidou in the final, 6–3, 6–4.

Seeds

Draw

References 
 Draw

Fukuoka International Women's Cup - Doubles
Fukuoka International Women's Cup